Billboard Philippines (also known and stylized as billboardPH) was a music media brand owned by Algo-Rhythm Communications in partnership with Billboard. It was announced in June 2016 and officially launched on September 15, 2016. It provided music news, print and mobile publishing, music conferences and licensed shows for radio, Internet and television.

On June 10, 2017, after months of formulations, it announced three weekly music charts: Philippine Hot 100, Philippine Top 20, and Catalog Chart. The first chart was published on June 12, 2017, coinciding with the 119th Philippine Independence Day. All charts were published every Monday.

Billboard Philippines ceased publication on January 15, 2018. The editor-in-chief Francis Reyes and Algo-Rhythm Communications did not release an official statement regarding their inactivity. On February 14, 2022, Billboard debuted the Philippines Songs chart as part of their Hits of the World chart collection, continuing the ranking of the top 25 songs weekly in the Philippines along with more than 40 countries around the globe.

Charts
 Philippine Hot 100: ranked the most popular local and international songs in the Philippines.
 Philippine Top 20: ranked the most popular local songs in the Philippines.
 Catalog Chart: ranked the most popular local songs older than three years in the Philippines.
 Top 20 Social Chart: ranked the most followed Filipino artists on social networking services.
 K-Pop Top 5: launched on September 15, 2017, it ranked the most popular K-pop songs in the Philippines.

Hot 100 number-ones (overall)

Top 20 number-ones (local)

See also
 Hits of the World
 Philippines Songs (Billboard)

References

2016 establishments in the Philippines
2018 disestablishments in the Philippines
Billboard (magazine)
Magazines about the media
Magazines established in 2016
Philippine music websites
Magazines published in the Philippines
Philippine record charts
Magazines disestablished in 2018
Defunct magazines published in the Philippines